Pierre and Wright was an architectural firm in Indianapolis, Indiana in the United States. It was established in 1925 by partners Edward D. Pierre, AIA (1890–1971) and  George Caleb Wright, AIA, (1889–1973). It was one of the predecessor firms of Vonnegut, Wright & Yeager.

Pierre & Wright was responsible for many landmarks in Indianapolis and greater Indiana, and a number have been listed on the National Register of Historic Places. After the partnership disbanded in 1944, Pierre started his firm Pierre and Associates. Among the architects employed by this firm were Kenneth B. Curtiss, D. B. Hill, James O. Lewis, James M. Merrifield, J. Parke Randall, D. P. Schlegel, and Richard C. Zimmer. Wright started a new firm with Kurt Vonnegut Sr. of Vonnegut, Bohn & Mueller called Vonnegut & Wright. After Ralph Oscar Yeager of Miller & Yeager joined, the firm became Vonnegut, Wright & Yeager. Later the firm was known as Wright Porteous & Lowe.

Works by Pierre & Wright Architects
Indianapolis Public School #7
Indianapolis Public School #78
Williams Creek Estates: Indianapolis News Model Houses
Oxford Gables Apartments
Tuckaway Country Club
Sears Roebuck (320 N. New Jersey, Indianapolis)
Indiana State Library and Historical Building, Indianapolis, Indiana
Milo Stuart Memorial Building, Arsenal Technical High School (Indianapolis, Indiana)
Old Trails office building (301–309 W. Washington Street)

References

Footnotes

Sources
Huntington, Jeffrey. The Indianapolis Architectural Firm of Pierre and Wright: A History of the Firm, Discussion of Major Works, and Indes of Known Commissions, 1994
Pierre and Wright Architectural Records Collection, Drawings and Documents Archive, Ball State University Libraries.

Architecture firms based in Indianapolis
Defunct companies based in Indianapolis
Design companies established in 1925
Design companies disestablished in 1944
1925 establishments in Indiana
1944 disestablishments in Indiana
Art Deco architects
Beaux Arts architects